KMAJ (1440 kHz) is an AM radio station in Topeka, Kansas. KMAJ is a news/talk station owned by Cumulus Media.

History
KMAJ signed on the air in July 1947 as KJAY (The Jayhawker Station), featuring a blend of middle-of-the-road (MOR) music and news. In March 1962 Fred Reynolds, dba Midland Broadcasters, Inc., acquired KJAY. He immediately changed the call letters to KEWI and the format to Top-40, bringing in some of Gordon McLendon's "Raiders" (high-energy DJs) to make a big splash on "Big KeeWee". By the late 1960s these "KeeWee Good Guys" had made KEWI the city's top-rated station. The weekly Top 20+20 Tunedex survey evolved into a Fab 40 Tunedex to go with the British Invasion and then to a Top 14+40 Tunedex to match its dial position at 1440 kHz. By September 1980, the station had changed format to country music and was using the slogan "Kix Country" with the call letters KSKX. Then, to capitalize on the popularity of the "Retro" craze, the KEWI call letters came back in November 1986. By 1990 contemporary music had moved to the FM dial and AM was talk-oriented. So KEWI changed call letters to KMAJ (Magic) along with its sister FM. Cumulus bought the station from Midland Broadcasters in February 1999 and began simulcasting syndicated talk shows and programming with KMBZ radio in Kansas City.

Programming
Beginning with the 2014–15 season, KWIC, along with KMAJ (AM) (1440), will be home to the Kansas Jayhawks football and basketball (men/women's) teams. Previously, the games had been aired on WIBW (AM) (580).

In addition, KMAJ also carries local high school basketball and football games.

See also
 KMAJ-FM

References

External links
 

News and talk radio stations in the United States
MAJ (AM)
Radio stations established in 1947
1947 establishments in Kansas
Cumulus Media radio stations